Adelaide Omonia Cobras FC is an Australian semi-professional football club from Adelaide, South Australia. The Cobras currently play in the South Australian State League 1, and play home games at Weigall Oval in Adelaide's western suburb of Plympton.

History
The Adelaide Omonia Football Club was founded in 1972 by the local Cypriot Australian community. The original concept behind the creation of the club was to give young migrants an outlet to socialise rather than spend their time in the coffee shops and gambling spots of Adelaide. The club name Adelaide Omonia was to signify the City of Adelaide and "Omonia" meaning unity with Adelaide and its surrounding communities and suburbs.

The club was registered and competed in the South Australian Amateur League's Division 4 in 1973. After winning the Division 4 championship in 1974, the club was promoted to Division 3. By 1981 the club was competing in the South Australian Amateur League's Division 1 and was one of the more competitive teams through the 1980s.

By 1988 the club was looking for a broader challenge. The Adelaide Omonia Football Club had established a very successful junior program, and so to give these juniors a path to play in the top level within South Australia, applied for and succeeded in gaining entry into the South Australian Football Federation's State League. Over the years the club has established itself as a stable and competitive club, well respected within the South Australian Football Federation and the broader soccer community.

In 1994 the club was looking to widen its appeal outside of the Cyprus community and changed their name to the Adelaide Cobras Football Club.

In 1998 the Adelaide Cobras played off in a preliminary final at Hindmarsh stadium after finishing 4th in the 2nd division that year under former NSL player/coach Raymond Blair. Unfortunately promotion to the first division eluded the club going down 2-0 to Para Hills in the playoff decider.
 
In 2004, under coach and former NSL player Nick Pantsaras, the Adelaide Cobras sat on top of Division 2 for the best part of the season but were pipped for the title on the last day of the season, going down to Playford 3-1 at Weigall Oval. This saw them miss out on promotion once again.
 
In 2006 the SASF introduced a Third Division and the Cobras competed in this league after finishing in the lower half of Division 2 in 2005.  The 2006 year was a great success for the club with the Adelaide Cobras completing at treble of titles in the Seniors, Reserves and Under 18s who all finished top of their respective leagues. Club stalwart and former player John Harpas coached the Seniors to the title in 2006 which saw the club promoted back to Division 2.
  
In 2009 the Adelaide Cobras finally achieved promotion to the top tier of FFSA being the NPL or first division by finishing minor premiers. The club played off in a Grand Final at Hindmarsh Stadium against Cumberland United which finished 1-1 after ET and were unlucky to go down 5-4 on penalties. 
In 2010 the club played in the NPL for the first time and whilst being competitive, unfortunately were relegated back to the 2nd division. 

After consolidating for two seasons the Adelaide Cobras again challenged for the Div 2 title in 2012, under coach Maged Ibrahim. In a pulsating finish to the year (no finals played that season) the Cobras defeated Salisbury 7-4 in Round 22 and only lost top spot by goal difference to Para Hills. Nonetheless a 2nd place finish saw the Cobras promoted back to the NPL in 2013.
 
The 2013 season in the top flight again proved difficult with the club finishing 2nd bottom and relegated back to Division 2. In 2014 and 2015 the Adelaide Cobras competed in Division 2 before the FFSA once again decided to introduce a Third division named State League 2. An eleventh place finish in 2015 (11th out of 16 teams) unluckily saw the Cobras placed in State League 2 for 2016.
 
The Adelaide Cobras remained very competitive in State League 2 with the team going close to promotion to State League 1 in 2017,2018 and 2019, but falling short in several play off finals.
 
In 2020 the Adelaide Cobras, under coaches John Falidis and Zep Barca, were finally successful in gaining promotion to State League 1 after finishing minor premiers and finishing on top of the ladder. In an exciting last game in round 22, the Cobras defeated close rivals Modbury Vista 1-0 at Jack Smith Park to clinch promotion and top position in the league standings. A couple of semi-finals wins against Eastern Utd saw the team qualify for the Grand Final at The Parks, again having to face Eastern United in the Grand Final. In a tough encounter the game went to into extra time but ultimately ended in a 1-0 loss. 

In the 2021 State League 1 season, the Cobras remained competitive but were relegated to SL2 by goal difference after finishing 11th. The 2022 State League 2 season saw the Cobras dominate the league finishing top by 8 points and clinching the Premiers trophy and automatic promotion back to SL1. The Under 18s also clinched the Premiership and Championship double by going undefeated for the entire season, cementing a successful year for the club. 2023 will see the Adelaide Omonia Cobras return to SL1 action.

Club honours

Domestic tournaments
U18 State League Champions 1994
 State League Champions: 2006
 FFSA Premier League Champions: 2009
 FFSA Premier League Runner-up: 2012
FFSA State League Reserves Champions 2016
 FSA State League 2 Premiers: 2020, 2022
FSA U18 State League 2 Champions & Premiers 2022

References

External links
 Official Website

Cobras
National Premier Leagues clubs
Association football clubs established in 1972
1972 establishments in Australia